Dan Skogen (born December 14, 1957) is a Minnesotan politician and a former member of the Minnesota Senate who represented District 10, which includes all or portions of Becker, Otter Tail and Wadena counties in the northwestern part of the state.

Education and professional career
Skogen grew up near Phelps Mill in Maine Township. He graduated from Battle Lake High School and has an audio communications degree from Thief River Falls Technical College. He is the sports director at radio stations in Wadena. He resides near Hewitt with his wife, Dee, and has two children.

Service in the Minnesota Senate
A Democrat, Skogen was first elected in 2006. He lost his re-election bid in the November 2, 2010, general election to Republican Gretchen Hoffman. While in office, his special legislative concerns included the environment, agriculture, and education.

Skogen was a member of the senate's Agriculture and Veterans Committee, the Commerce and Consumer Protection Committee, the Education Committee and the Environment and Natural Resources Committee. He also served on and chaired the Environment and Natural Resources Subcommittee for Public Lands and Waters, and on the Finance subcommittees for the Agriculture and Veterans Budget and Policy Division and the E-12 Education Budget and Policy Division.

In 2012, Skogen ran for Minnesota Senate again in the redrawn Senate District 8 and lost to Bill Ingebrigtsen.

Electoral history
2012 Minnesota State Senate District 8
Bill Ingebrigtsen (R), 22,712 votes, 52.86%
Dan Skogen (DFL), 20,213 votes, 47.04%

2010 Minnesota State Senate District 10
Gretchen Hoffman (R), 17,048 votes, 54.79%
Dan Skogen (DFL), 14,040 votes, 45.12%
Write-In, 29 votes, 0.09%

2006 Minnesota State Senate District 10
Cal Larson (R), 14,191 votes, 44.71%
Dan Skogen (DFL), 17,530 votes, 55.23%
Write-In, 18 votes, 0.06%

References

External links

Senate District 10 Map
Senator Skogen Web Page
Senator Skogen Campaign Web Site
Minnesota Public Radio Votetracker: Senator Dan Skogen

1957 births
Living people
People from Fergus Falls, Minnesota
American Lutherans
Democratic Party Minnesota state senators
People from Todd County, Minnesota
21st-century American politicians